Carlo Alberto Conelli, count de Prosperi, best known as Caberto Conelli (Born in Belgirate, Piedmont 28 August 1889 – 25 August 1974) was a sometime Italian racecar driver.

He raced once for Bugatti in 1920 and in his only other race won the 1931 Belgian Grand Prix with William Grover-Williams.

He died at 84 years old.

1889 births
1974 deaths
Italian racing drivers
24 Hours of Le Mans drivers
Grand Prix drivers
Sportspeople from the Province of Verbano-Cusio-Ossola
European Championship drivers